Arsenaria sanctalis is a species of snout moth in the genus Arsenaria. It was described by George Hampson in 1900 and is known from Syria.

References

Moths described in 1900
Hypotiini
Moths of Asia